Ullah is an Islamic name, which means "of Allah" or "of The God". 
 
Ullah is the form assumed by "Allah" when in a genitive construction. For instance, in classical Arabic when case ending vowels were still pronounced, "servant of God" would be "`abdu -llāhi", where the initial "a" of "Allah" is dropped, thus producing the modern word "Abdullah". Other examples include Hizbullah (party of God), Irfanullah (knowledge of God), Jundullah (army of God), Mohibullah (friend of God), Nasrallah (victory of God), Asadullah (Lion of God).

The name Ullah may also refer to:

People

Kefayet Ullah (Born 1986), Australia, Co-founder & Country Manager of EarthChildren
Ahsan Ullah (born 1992), Pakistani football player 
Atiq Ullah (born 1983), Pakistani football player
Hamid Ullah Afsar (1895–1974), Indian writer
Hifazat Ullah Khan (born 1952), Pakistani general
Ibad Ullah (born 1974), Pakistani politician
Imran Ullah Khan (born 1932), Pakistani general
Israr Ullah Zehri (born 1965), Pakistani politician
Kamran Ullah (born 1983), Dutch journalist
Khalil Ullah Khan (1934–2014), Bangladeshi actor
M. M. Rahmat Ullah (born 1940), Bangladeshi politician
Mushahid Ullah Khan (born 1952), Pakistani politician
Qudrat Ullah Shahab (1917–1987), Pakistani writer
Rahim Ullah (died 1861), Bengali rebel 
Sajjad Ullah Baqi (born 1979), Pakistani politician
Shahkur Ullah Durrani (1928–2009), Pakistani businessman
S.M. Ullah, Bangladeshi scientist
Zaka Ullah Bhangoo (1948–2007), Pakistani general
Dr Zaker Ullah, Bangla TV Presenter
Zameer Ullah Khan (born 1966), Indian politician

See also
List of Arabic theophoric names
Arabic words and phrases
Bengali Muslim surnames